John Skrataas (4 May 1890 – 12 February 1961) was a Norwegian gymnast who competed in the 1908 Summer Olympics.

As a member of the Norwegian team, he won the silver medal in the gymnastics team event in 1908. He was born in Egge and died in Steinkjer and represented the club Steinkjer TF.

References

1890 births
1961 deaths
People from Steinkjer
Norwegian male artistic gymnasts
Gymnasts at the 1908 Summer Olympics
Olympic gymnasts of Norway
Olympic silver medalists for Norway
Olympic medalists in gymnastics
Medalists at the 1908 Summer Olympics
Sportspeople from Trøndelag
20th-century Norwegian people